Åsnes is a municipality in Innlandet county, Norway. It is located in the traditional district of Solør. The administrative centre of the municipality is the village of Flisa, which is also the largest village in the municipality with around 1,700 people. Other villages in the municipality include Gjesåsen, Hof, and Kjellmyra.

The  municipality is the 108th largest by area out of the 356 municipalities in Norway. Åsnes is the 137th most populous municipality in Norway with a population of 7,211.

General information

When municipal government was established in Norway on 1 January 1838, the Åsnes area was part of Hof Municipality. In 1849, Hof municipality was divided into two: Hof (population: 2,913) and Åsnes og Våler (population: 7,087). A short time later, in 1854, the municipality of Åsnes og Våler was  divided into the two current municipalities of Våler (population: 3,410) and Åsnes (population: 3,677). During the 1960s, there were many municipal mergers across Norway due to the work of the Schei Committee. On 1 January 1963, Hof Municipality (population: 3,222) was merged into Åsnes Municipality (population: 6,750). On 1 January 1969, the Rotberget farm area (population: 23) in the Finnskogen part of the municipality was transferred to the neighboring municipality of Grue. In the 2010s, there had been talk of further municipal mergers but the neighboring municipalities of Grue and Våler both rejected merging with Åsnes.

Name
The municipality (originally the parish) is named after the old  farm, since the first Åsnes Church was built there. (The headland is made by the river Glomma, and the farm is lying beneath a hill.) Historically, the name was spelled Aasnes.

Coat of arms
The coat of arms was granted on 9 December 2001. The arms show three black hooks for log driving on a gold background. This was chosen to represent the importance of logging and forestry to the municipality throughout history.

Churches
The Church of Norway has six parishes within the municipality of Åsnes. It is part of the Solør, Vinger og Odal prosti (deanery) in the Diocese of Hamar.

Geography
The municipality is located in the southern part of Innlandet county in the traditional region of Solør. Åsnes is bordered to the north by the municipality of Våler, to the south by Grue, to the west by Nord-Odal and Stange, and to the east it borders Torsby Municipality in Värmland County, Sweden.

Åsnes has several lakes and rivers throughout the forested municipality which sits in the southern Glåmdal valley. It includes the lakes Gjesåssjøen, Hukusjøen, and Vermunden. The rivers Flisa, Rotna, and Glomma all flow through the municipality.

Government
All municipalities in Norway, including Åsnes, are responsible for primary education (through 10th grade), outpatient health services, senior citizen services, unemployment and other social services, zoning, economic development, and municipal roads. The municipality is governed by a municipal council of elected representatives, which in turn elects a mayor.  The municipality falls under the Østre Innlandet District Court and the Eidsivating Court of Appeal.

Municipal council
The municipal council  of Åsnes is made up of 23 representatives that are elected to four year terms. The party breakdown of the council is as follows:

Mayors
The mayors of Åsnes (incomplete list):
2003-2007: Frank Willy Bjørneseth (Ap)
2007-2011: Lars Petter Heggelund (V)
2011-2019: Ørjan Bue (Sp)
2019–present: Kari Heggelund (Sp)

Notable people 

 Hans Jacob Grøgaard (1764 in Åsnes – 1836) a parish priest and writer, rep. at the Norwegian Constituent Assembly
 Johannes Bergh (1837 in Åsnes – 1906) a barrister, Attorney General of Norway 1893-1904
 Jacob Sparre Schneider (1853 in Åsnes – 1918) a Norwegian zoologist and entomologist
 Adolf Gundersen (1865 in Åsnes – 1938) an American physician, founded Gundersen Health System in La Crosse, Wisconsin
 Per Aasness (1875 at Flaen – 1959) a military officer and politician, Mayor of Asnes, 1919-1922
 Ole Bjerke (1881 in Åsnes – 1959) a sport shooter, competed at the 1912 Summer Olympics
 Arne Løfsgaard (1887 at Løfsgaard – 1974) a farmer and politician. Mayor of Åsnes 1925-1928
 Birger Lie (1891 in Åsnes – 1970) a sport shooter, competed at the 1912 Summer Olympics
 Jon Gudbjørn Dybendal (1904 in Åsnes – 1985) a politician, Mayor of Åsnes, 1945-1963
 Rolf Jacobsen (1907–1994) an author and modernist writer, twice lived in Åsnes
 Kai Grjotheim (1919 in Åsnes – 2003) a chemist and academic, solved problems within thermodynamics of salt smelters
 Gunnar Gundersen (born 1956 in Åsnes) a politician, also competed in the swimming at the 1976 Summer Olympics
 Tom Stræte Lagergren (born 1991 in Åsnes) stage name Matoma, a DJ and record producer
 Emilie Enger Mehl (born 1993 in Lørenskog) politician for the Centre Party. She has served as minister of justice since 2021 and Member of parliament since 2017.

Sister cities
Åsnes has sister city agreements with the following places:

  Ballerup, Region Hovedstaden, Denmark
  Fagersta, Västmanland County, Sweden
  Jämsä, Länsi-Suomi, Finland
  Myjava, Trenčín Region, Slovakia
  Vasanello, Viterbo, Italy

Gallery

References

External links

Municipal fact sheet from Statistics Norway 

 
Municipalities of Innlandet
1854 establishments in Norway